Isser may refer to:
 Isser (name), a given name and surname (including a list of people with the name)
Isser District, a district in Boumerdès Province, Algeria
Issers, a town and municipality in that district
Isser River, a river flowing through the district

See also 
 Iser (disambiguation)